Honeymoon is a 1928 German silent film directed by E. W. Emo and starring Margot Landa, Harald Paulsen, and Geza L. Weiss.

The film's art direction was by Kurt Richter.

Cast

References

Bibliography
 Gerhard Lamprecht. Deutsche Stummfilme: 1927–1931.

External links

1928 films
Films of the Weimar Republic
German silent feature films
Films directed by E. W. Emo
German black-and-white films
1920s German films